Fissurella pulchra is a species of sea snail, a marine gastropod mollusk in the family Fissurellidae, the keyhole limpets and slit limpets.

Description
The size of the shell attains 70 mm.

Distribution
This marine species occurs off Chile.

References

External links
 To Biodiversity Heritage Library (8 publications)
 To GenBank (12 nucleotides; 12 proteins)
 To World Register of Marine Species
 

Fissurellidae
Gastropods described in 1834
Endemic fauna of Chile